Mr. Broadway: Tony Bennett's Greatest Broadway Hits is a 1962 album by Tony Bennett.

Track listing
"Stranger In Paradise" (from the 1953 Broadway musical Kismet) (Alexander Borodin /  George Forrest / Robert Wright)
"Just In Time" (from the 1956 Broadway musical Bells Are Ringing) (Jule Styne / Betty Comden / Adolph Green) -2:36
"Lazy Afternoon" (from the 1954 Broadway musical The Golden Apple) (John Latouche / Jerome Moross)
"Love Look Away" (from the 1958 Broadway musical Flower Drum Song) (Richard Rodgers / Oscar Hammerstein II) - 2:45
"The Party's Over" (from the 1956 Broadway musical Bells Are Ringing) (Styne / Comden / Green) - 3:06
"You'll Never Get Away From Me" (from the 1959 musical Gyspy) (Stephen Sondheim / Styne) - 2:07
"Climb Ev'ry Mountain" (from the 1959 musical The Sound of Music) (Rodgers / Hammerstein II) - 2:21
"Begin the Beguine" (from the 1935 musical Jubilee (Cole Porter)
"Baby, Talk to Me" (from the 1960 musical Bye Bye Birdie) (Charles Strouse / Lee Adams) 
"Put On a Happy Face" (from the 1960 musical Bye Bye Birdie) (Strouse / Adams)
"Follow Me" (from the 1960 musical Camelot) (Alan Lerner / Frederick Loewe)
"Comes Once in a Lifetime" (from the 1961 musical Subways Are For Sleeping) (Styne / Comden / Green)

Personnel
 Tony Bennett - vocals
 Percy Faith - arranger

References

1962 greatest hits albums
Tony Bennett albums
Columbia Records compilation albums